The 2007 European Karate Championships, the 42nd edition, were held  in Bratislava, Slovakia from 4 to 6 May 2007.

Medallists

Men's competition

Individual

Team

Women's competition

Individual

Team

References

2007
Karate
European championships in 2007
Sports competitions in Bratislava
2007 in Slovakia
2000s in Bratislava
Karate competitions in Slovakia
May 2007 sports events in Europe